Special needs is an older term for disability which means that a person may require provision of accommodations, supports and services to have equitable access to opportunities and participate in the society.

Special needs may also refer to:

Category of people
 Alternative education, includes a number of approaches to teaching and learning separate from that offered by mainstream traditional education
 Special education, educating students with special educational needs
 Special education in the United Kingdom
 Special Needs Evacuation Tracking System, Texas

Entertainment
 Special Needs (film), a 2007 film by Isaak James
 Special Needs, former name of the British band The Needs
 "Special Needs" (Placebo song), a song by the British rock band

Other
 Special needs exception, an exception to the Fourth Amendment's general requirement that government searches be supported by a warrant and probable cause